Yuen Long Estate was a public housing estate in Yuen Long Town, Yuen Long, New Territories, Hong Kong, located to the east of Long Ping station on the MTR. It was the first public housing estate in Yuen Long. The estate had five residential blocks built in 1968 that were demolished in 2001. The site was then turned into an outdoor car park. The site has been rebuilt as two parts—Long Ching Estate, a public housing estate, and Yuccie Square, a private housing estate.

References

Yuen Long Town
Yuen Long District
Former public housing estates in Hong Kong
Residential buildings completed in 1968
2001 disestablishments in Hong Kong
Demolished buildings and structures in Hong Kong
Buildings and structures demolished in 2001